Rose Lagercrantz (born in Stockholm in 1947) is a Swedish writer for children and adults.

Her first book was published in 1973, and she has since had her work translated into English, German, Korean, Japanese, Italian, Russian and Slovak.

Books (selection)
2010 – Mitt lyckliga liv
2012 – Om man ännu finns
2012 – Mitt hjärta hoppar och skrattar (illustrated by Eva Eriksson)
2012 – Födelsedagsbarnet (illustrated by Rebecka Lagercrantz)
2013 – Julbarnet (illustrated by Rebecka Lagercrantz)
2013 – Barnvakten (illustrated by Rebecka Lagercrantz)
2014 – Sist jag var som lyckligast (illustrated by Eva Eriksson)
2015 – Livet enligt Dunne

English translations
2012 – My Happy Life, (Gecko Press) 136pp.,  
2014 – My Heart is Laughing, (Gecko Press) 120pp., 
2015 – When I Am Happiest, (Gecko Press) 128pp.,  
2016 – Life According to Dani, (Gecko Press) 108pp., 
2017 – See You When I See You, (Gecko Press) 152pp., 
2019 – Where Dani Goes, Happy Follows, (Gecko Press) 184pp., 
2020 – All's Happy That Ends Happy, (Gecko Press) 224pp.,

Awards (selection)
1979 – Astrid Lindgren Prize
1980 – Nils Holgersson Plaque
1988 – Expressens Heffaklump
1992 – Vi Magazine Literature Prize
1995 – August Prize

References

External links

Rose Lagercrantz author biography 
Official author website (Swedish)

1947 births
Living people
Swedish women writers
Rose